Edwin Epps was a slaveholder on a cotton plantation in Avoyelles Parish, Louisiana. He was the third and longest enslaver of Solomon Northup, who was kidnapped in Washington, D.C. in 1841 and forced into slavery. On January 3, 1853, Northup left Epps's property and returned to his family in New York.

Personal life
Edwin Epps was born in North Carolina around 1808. By 1843, he married Mary Elvira Robert, with whom he had children: John (b. ca. 1843), Edwin (b. ca. 1846), Robert (b. ca. 1849), Virginia (b. ca. 1851), Mary (b. ca 1853), Wilbur (b. ca. 1855), and Massa (b. ca. 1858). The eldest, John was not living with the family in 1860.

Overseer and enslaver
Epps was an overseer on the Oakland Plantation (now the site of Louisiana State University of Alexandria). When Archy P. Williams, the plantation's owner, was unable to pay Epps, he transferred eight slaves and some money for lost wages. Epps then purchased 325.5 acres in Holmesville, Avoyelles Parish, Louisiana. The eight enslaved people included a family of five, a single man, and a woman named Patsey who came from a single plantation in Williamsburg County, South Carolina.

He settled in Avoyelles Parish, Louisiana in the mid-1840s. At that time it was frontier land opened up through the Louisiana Purchase, where he and other planters made money growing cotton through the efforts of enslaved people. Epps initially leased land from his wife's paternal uncle and later purchased his own farm. The former overseer never attained the status of the planter class, who would have had more land and more than 50 enslaved workers. He had a violent temper and was an alcoholic, who went on two-week long "sprees" in which he might enjoy dancing with or whipping his servants.

He also owned Solomon Northup, who had been given the slave name "Platt" after he had been kidnapped into slavery. Northup wrote the story in the memoir entitled Twelve Years a Slave. Northup and a Canadian carpenter Samuel Bass worked together on the modest plantation, Edwin Epps House. Bass wrote letters to Northup's friends in New York, which led to his being freed.

Women on Epps's property worked as hard as the men. They cleared land, built roads, plowed, and performed other forms of hard labor. They were also responsible for work in the barn, house, and the laundry. Both men and women were beaten and whipped. Northup, with the position of overseer, was expected to mete out whippings to other enslaved people. An enslaved woman Celeste resisted being whipped by hiding out in the swamp for three months. Patsey, who left the farm to get a small bar of soap from a neighboring plantation, was beaten brutally. She had been denied the use of soap by Epps's wife Mary, who was jealous of Patsey, who was raped by Epps. He was violent in his treatment of Patsey, inflicting "life-threatening whippings" on her.

In 1850, Epps owned six enslaved men and two women from the ages of 11 to 40. In 1860, Epps owned eight enslaved men and four women from the ages of 15 to 65.

Mary ensured that the enslaved women on their property knew that she was their superior. She was particularly incensed that her husband raped Patsey. She was dogged in her intention to have Patsey sold away from them.

Popular culture
 Michael Fassbender played Epps in the 2013 film 12 Years a Slave.

References

Sources
 
 

1808 births
American slave owners
American planters
American white supremacists
People from North Carolina
People from Avoyelles Parish, Louisiana
Year of death missing